Pongal (lit. 'to boil over') is a South Indian and Sri Lankan dish of rice cooked in boiling milk. A part of Tamil cuisine, varieties include venn (hot) pongal, sakkarai pongal made with jaggery, kozhi pongal made with chicken, and sanyasi pongal made with vegetables.

Varieties

Venn (hot) pongal

Venn pongal is made with asafoetida, black pepper, ginger, and turmeric.

Sakkarai pongal

Sakkarai pongal is made with jaggery, cardamom, cashews, and golden raisins.

Kozhi pongal
Kozhi pongal is made with chicken and spices.

Sanyasi pongal
Sanyasi pongal is made with vegetables.

References

External links 

Indian rice dishes
Tamil cuisine